Miłocin may refer to the following places:
Miłocin, Gmina Wojciechów in Lublin Voivodeship (east Poland)
Miłocin, Pomeranian Voivodeship (north Poland)
Miłocin, Subcarpathian Voivodeship (south-east Poland)